Tentação is a 1997 Portuguese drama film directed by Joaquim Leitão. It was released on 26 December 1997.

Cast
Joaquim de Almeida as António
Cristina Câmara as Lena
Ana Bustorff
Diogo Infante
Sofia Leite

Production
It had a budget of $265,000,000. The filming locations included Vila Nova de Gaia and Lisbon.

Synopsis 
Father Antonio is a priest by vocation, committed and generous, very dear to the people of Vila Daires, a quiet town in the North of the country. But Father Antonio is also a man, and Vila Daires is not as peaceful as it seems. Father António's good intentions will not be enough to stop the escalating conflicts. And when his fate crosses paths with Lena, the town's "black sheep", he will also be forced to confront his own demons. Especially those he never even thought existed.

Reception
18 days after being released, the film had had 203,853 admissions.

Accolades

References

External links

1997 drama films
1997 films
Films directed by Joaquim Leitão
Films set in Portugal
Films shot in Lisbon
Films shot in Vila Nova de Gaia
Portuguese drama films
Golden Globes (Portugal) winners
1990s Portuguese-language films